Davarijan (also Romanized as Davārījān; also known as Bāmsar, Bāmsar-e Pā’īn, and Ḩedārījān) is a village in Silakhor Rural District, Silakhor District, Dorud County, Lorestan Province, Iran. At the 2006 census, its population was 192, in 45 families.

References 

Towns and villages in Dorud County